Ashbourne RFC is an Irish rugby team based in Ashbourne, County Meath, playing in Division 1A of the Leinster League. The club colours are black and gold. In 2020 the president of Ashbourne was announced as Conor Cunningham Aka Ham, will taken to role of president until the foreseeable future.

The club's ground at Milltown, Ashbourne, County Meath has recently hosted Ireland women's national rugby union team international matches.

References
 Ashbourne RFC

Irish rugby union teams
Rugby clubs established in 1974
Rugby union clubs in County Meath